Andreu Fontàs Prat (born 14 November 1989) is a Spanish professional footballer who plays as a centre-back for Major League Soccer club Sporting Kansas City.

Club career

Early years
Born in Banyoles, Girona, Catalonia, Fontàs was a product of FC Barcelona's youth system, having previously played for amateurs CD Banyoles for 11 years.

Originally a defensive midfielder, he was reconverted into central defender by the B team's coach Luis Enrique, a former Barcelona player.

Barcelona

Fontàs made his first team debut on 31 August 2009, replacing another La Masia graduate, Gerard Piqué, in the final six minutes of a 3–0 La Liga home win against Sporting de Gijón. Earlier into the 2009–10 campaign he was called by manager Pep Guardiola to the Spanish Supercup and UEFA Super Cup games, respectively against Athletic Bilbao and FC Shakhtar Donetsk, but finally did not make the bench on either occasion. He spent the vast majority of his first senior seasons registered with the reserves.

On 20 November 2010, Fontàs started for the first time in the league with the first team, assisting Pedro with a 50-meter pass for the fourth goal, as Barcelona trounced UD Almería 8–0 away. He made his UEFA Champions League debut on 7 December, against FC Rubin Kazan: as the Blaugrana had already progressed to the knock-out stages as group winners, he scored in the 2–0 home victory, converting a pass from fellow youth graduate Thiago Alcântara.

On 16 March 2011, Fontàs was promoted to the senior team on a permanent basis after Eric Abidal was diagnosed with a tumour in his liver, thus becoming unavailable for the rest of the season. He appeared in three consecutive matches in April/May for the eventual champions, always as a left back. On the 15th, as a starter, he returned to his natural position, in a 0–0 home draw against Deportivo de La Coruña.

Fontàs remained a backup in 2011–12. On 12 January 2012, in a game at CA Osasuna in the round of 16 of the Copa del Rey, he suffered an anterior cruciate ligament injury in the tenth minute of the game, being sidelined for several months.

On 15 October 2012, Fontàs was loaned to RCD Mallorca until the end of the campaign, as backup to João Victor who suffered a severe knee injury. He was almost exclusively used as a defensive midfielder during his spell in the Balearic Islands, with the campaign ending in relegation.

Celta
On 20 June 2013, Fontàs was signed by RC Celta de Vigo, who paid €1 million for the player and signed him to a three-year deal, with Barcelona reserving a buy-back option in addition to rights on any future transfer. He rejoined former Barcelona B boss Luis Enrique in the process, and finished his first year at Balaídos with 35 appearances (more than 3,000 minutes of action) to help to a ninth-place finish.

Fontàs terminated his contract with the Galician club on 7 August 2018.

Sporting Kansas City
On 8 August 2018, Fontàs joined Sporting Kansas City. He made his Major League Soccer debut on 8 September, starting in the 1–0 victory against Orlando City SC. 

Fontàs scored his first goal on 24 October 2020, the second in a 4–0 defeat of Colorado Rapids.

Club statistics

Honours
Barcelona
La Liga: 2009–10, 2010–11
Copa del Rey: 2011–12
Supercopa de España: 2009, 2011
UEFA Champions League: 2010–11
UEFA Super Cup: 2011
FIFA Club World Cup: 2011

Spain U20
Mediterranean Games: 2009

References

External links

1989 births
Living people
People from Pla de l'Estany
Sportspeople from the Province of Girona
Spanish footballers
Footballers from Catalonia
Association football defenders
Association football midfielders
Association football utility players
La Liga players
Segunda División players
Segunda División B players
Tercera División players
Girona FC players
FC Barcelona Atlètic players
FC Barcelona players
RCD Mallorca players
RC Celta de Vigo players
Major League Soccer players
Sporting Kansas City players
UEFA Champions League winning players
Spain youth international footballers
Spain under-21 international footballers
Competitors at the 2009 Mediterranean Games
Mediterranean Games medalists in football
Mediterranean Games gold medalists for Spain
Catalonia international footballers
Spanish expatriate footballers
Expatriate soccer players in the United States
Spanish expatriate sportspeople in the United States